Salifidae is a family of annelids belonging to the order Arhynchobdellida.

Genera:
 Barbronia Johansson, 1918
 Linta Westergren & Siddall, 2004
 Lumbricobdella Kennel, 1886
 Mimobdella
 Odontobdella
 Salifa Blanchard, 1897

References

Annelids